Entertainment Center is a station on the River Line light rail system, located on Delaware Avenue in Camden, New Jersey. It is the southern terminus of the River Line, and is named for the nearby Freedom Mortgage Pavilion on the Camden Waterfront.

The station opened on March 15, 2004. Northbound service is available to the Trenton Rail Station with connections to New Jersey Transit trains to New York City, SEPTA trains to Philadelphia, Pennsylvania, and Amtrak trains. Transfers to the PATCO Speedline are available at the Walter Rand Transportation Center.

No connecting service is available at this station.

References

External links

 Station from Google Maps Street View

River Line stations
Railway stations in the United States opened in 2004
2004 establishments in New Jersey
Transportation in Camden, New Jersey
Railway stations in Camden County, New Jersey